Calcimitra meyeriana is a species of sea snail, a marine gastropod mollusk in the family Mitridae, the miters or miter snails.

Description

Distribution
This marine species occurs off Natal, South Africa.

References

 Salisbury, R., 1992. Descrizione di una nuova Cancilla dal Sud Africa. La Conchiglia 262: 12-16

External links
 Fedosov A., Puillandre N., Herrmann M., Kantor Yu., Oliverio M., Dgebuadze P., Modica M.V. & Bouchet P. (2018). The collapse of Mitra: molecular systematics and morphology of the Mitridae (Gastropoda: Neogastropoda). Zoological Journal of the Linnean Society. 183(2): 253-337

Endemic fauna of South Africa
Mitridae
Gastropods described in 1992